Ashok Choudhary is an Indian politician from Barbigha Sheikhpura in Bihar, India.  He has been a Member of the Bihar Legislative Council since 2014. Since June 2019, he is the Cabinet Minister for the Building Construction Department in the government led by Nitish Kumar. He previously was also Cabinet Minister for the Department of Education.

He was appointed to the position of Working President of Janta Dal United, Bihar.

Political career 
In 2000 Bihar Legislative Assembly election, he won from Barbigha (Vidhan Sabha constituency) as an Indian National Congress candidate. Later in 2013, he was appointed Chief of Bihar Pradesh Congress Committee. In 2014, he was elected as Member of Bihar Legislative Council. He held the position as Minister of Department of Education and Department of Information Technology in Government of Bihar from 2015 to 2017 and 2020 to present.

In 2018, he left Indian National Congress and joined Janta Dal United. He was appointed Minister of Building Construction Department, Government of Bihar on 2 June 2019.

References

External links 
 

Janata Dal (United) politicians
Members of the Bihar Legislative Council
Bihar MLAs 2000–2005
Living people
Indian National Congress politicians
Year of birth missing (living people)
Bihar MLAs 2020–2025
State cabinet ministers of Bihar